René Aubry is a French composer born in 1956. He is a multi-instrumentalist known for blending classical harmonies with modern instrumentation. Aubry has composed for choreographers such as Carolyn Carlson and Pina Bausch. He has scored for films, including several adaptations of books by Julia Donaldson, and released many of his own albums. His music features in the Greek comic-satirical TV series .

Discography
René Aubry (1983)
Chrysalide (1987)
Libre parcours (1988)
Derives (1989)
Steppe (1990)
La révolte des enfants (1991）
Après la pluie (1993)
Killer Kid (1994)
Ne m'oublie pas (1995)
Signes (1997)
Plaisirs d'amour (1998)
Invités sur la terre (2001)
Seuls au monde (2003)
Projection privée (2004)
Mémoires du futur (2006)
Play time (2008)
Refuges (2011) 
Forget Me Not (2013)
Days (2014)
Now (2015)
Chaos (2017)
 Petits sauts délicats avec grand écart (2018)

Soundtracks
The Gruffalo (2009)
The Gruffalo's Child (2011)
Room on the Broom (2012)
Chic! (2015)
Stick Man (2015)
The Highway Rat (2017)
Zog  (2018)
The Bears' Famous Invasion of Sicily (2019)
 The Snail and the Whale (2019)
Zog and the Flying Doctors (2020)

References

External links
 
The French René Aubry Wikipedia article
"Discographie de René Aubry" at Fnacmusic

French composers
French male composers
1956 births
Living people